The EX postcode area, also known as the Exeter postcode area, is a group of 33 postcode districts in South West England, within 30 post towns. These cover north and east Devon (including Exeter, Barnstaple, Axminster, Beaworthy, Bideford, Braunton, Budleigh Salterton, Chulmleigh, Colyton, Crediton, Cullompton, Dawlish, Exmouth, Holsworthy, Honiton, Ilfracombe, Lynmouth, Lynton, North Tawton, Okehampton, Ottery St Mary, Seaton, Sidmouth,  Sidford, Sidbury, South Molton, Tiverton, Torrington, Umberleigh, Winkleigh and Woolacombe), plus the northernmost part of Cornwall (including Bude). and a very small part of Somerset and Dorset.



Coverage
The approximate coverage of the postcode districts:

|-
! EX1
| EXETER
| Exeter (east), Heavitree (north), Monkerton, Newtown, Pinhoe, West Clyst
| Exeter
|-
! EX2
| EXETER
| Exeter (south), Heavitree (south), St. Thomas (south), Countess Wear, Wonford
| Exeter
|-
! EX3
| EXETER
| Clyst St George, Ebford, Exton, Topsham
| East Devon, Exeter
|-
! EX4
| EXETER
| Exeter (north), Exwick, St. Thomas (north), Beacon Heath, Redhills, Pennsylvania, St. James, Whitestone
| Exeter
|-
! EX5
| EXETER
| Bradninch, Broadclyst, Cadbury, Clyst Honiton, Clyst St. Mary, Cranbrook, Newton St. Cyres, Silverton, Talaton, Whimple, Woodbury
| East Devon, Mid Devon
|-
! EX6
| EXETER
| Christow, Cockwood, Dunsford, Kennford, Kenton, Mamhead, Exminster
| Teignbridge
|-
! EX7
| DAWLISH
| Dawlish, Dawlish Warren, Holcombe, Ashcombe
| Teignbridge
|-
! EX8
| EXMOUTH
| Exmouth, Lympstone
| East Devon
|-
! EX9
| BUDLEIGH SALTERTON
| Budleigh Salterton, East Budleigh, Otterton
| East Devon
|-
! EX10
| SIDMOUTH
| Sidmouth, Sidford, Sidbury
| East Devon
|-
! EX11
| OTTERY ST. MARY
| Ottery St. Mary, West Hill, Alfington
| East Devon
|-
! EX12
| SEATON
| Seaton, Beer, Axmouth, Branscombe
| East Devon
|-
! EX13
| AXMINSTER
| Axminster
| East Devon, Dorset
|-
! EX14
| HONITON
| Honiton
| East Devon
|-
! EX15
| CULLOMPTON
| Cullompton, Plymtree
| Mid Devon
|-
! EX16
| TIVERTON
| Tiverton
| Mid Devon
|-
! EX17
| CREDITON
| Crediton
| Mid Devon
|-
! EX18
| CHULMLEIGH
| Chulmleigh
| North Devon
|-
! EX19
| WINKLEIGH
| Winkleigh, Dolton, Beaford, Monkokehampton
| Torridge, West Devon
|-
! EX20
| NORTH TAWTON, OKEHAMPTON
| North Tawton, Okehampton
| West Devon
|-
! EX21
| BEAWORTHY
| Beaworthy
| West Devon
|-
! EX22
| HOLSWORTHY
| Holsworthy
| West Devon
|-
! EX23
| BUDE
| Bude, Coombe, Crackington Haven, Launcells, Poundstock, Stratton
| Cornwall
|-
! EX24
| COLYTON
| Colyton
| East Devon
|-
! EX31
| BARNSTAPLE
| Barnstaple (west), Fremington, Yarnscombe, Alverdiscott
| North Devon, Torridge
|-
! EX32
| BARNSTAPLE
| Barnstaple (east)
| North Devon
|-
! EX33
| BRAUNTON
| Braunton
| North Devon
|-
! EX34
| ILFRACOMBE, WOOLACOMBE
| Ilfracombe, Woolacombe
| North Devon
|-
! EX35
| LYNMOUTH, LYNTON
| Lynmouth, Lynton
| North Devon, Somerset West and Taunton
|-
! EX36
| SOUTH MOLTON
| South Molton
| North Devon
|-
! EX37
| UMBERLEIGH
| Umberleigh, High Bickington
| North Devon, Torridge
|-
! EX38
| TORRINGTON
| Great Torrington
| Torridge
|-
! EX39
| BIDEFORD
| Bideford, Northam, Appledore, Westward Ho!, Clovelly, Lundy Island
| Torridge
|}

Map

See also
Postcode Address File
List of postcode areas in the United Kingdom

References

External links
Royal Mail's Postcode Address File
A quick introduction to Royal Mail's Postcode Address File (PAF)

Postcode areas covering South West England
Cornwall-related lists